The Transfiguration Cathedral is a religious building of the Catholic Church that serves as the main temple of the Diocese of the Transfiguration in Novosibirsk in Russia. It was built between 1992 and 1997 in a modern style. It offers religious services including the Mass in Russian and Polish. The cathedral is located at Maxim Gorki Street.

The first stage was completed in 1993 with the design of architect Vladimir Borodin but was not consecrated until the August 10, 1997 in the presence of the Apostolic Nuncio in Russia John Bukovsky and Bishop Joseph Werth.

See also
Roman Catholicism in Russia
Transfiguration Cathedral
Roman Catholic Diocese of Transfiguration at Novosibirsk

References

Churches in Novosibirsk
Polish diaspora in Siberia
Roman Catholic cathedrals in Russia
Roman Catholic churches completed in 1997
Tsentralny City District, Novosibirsk
20th-century Roman Catholic church buildings in Russia